Konstantin G. Cheryomushkhin (Russian: Константин Г. Черёмушкин, 1963 – 1993), known as The Bataysk Maniac and Chikatilo's Double, was a Soviet serial killer. He raped and killed four girls in the satellite town of Bataysk in Rostov-on-Don, Rostov Oblast, Russian SFSR.

Biography 
The exact date of birth and birthplace of Cheryomushkhin is not clear. He was a spoiled child who always got what he wanted. It is known that in his youth Cheryomushkhin learned that his father was not really his father, as he was barren and allowed his mother to have children from extraneous men. Specialists believe that the discovery deformed Cheryomushkhin's psyche. He was tried twice for car theft.

The series of murders began in 1986. The first murder (that of Svetlana Yefimova) was committed by Cheryomushkhin earlier that year, after which he burned the body of the murdered girl at a stake. All three subsequent murders (Elena Gaeva, Tanya Khloboschina and Oksana Yakovenko) were also committed with particular cruelty. He offered the intended victims a ride in his personal car, then brought them to a deserted place and killed them. After the murders, Cheryomushkhin cut off their mammary glands and external genitalia from the victims.

In those years in the Rostov Oblast another killer, Andrei Chikatilo, was operating. Search for him involved a whole team of investigators from the Prosecutor's Office of the RSFSR, there was an operation named "Lesopolosa" to catch the killer. The investigators drew attention to the murders in Bataysk, initially assuming that the same killer was operating there. But then the investigation revealed that the murders were committed by another person, since he traveled to the crime scene by car and took away the victims' valuables (unlike Chikatilo). Cheryomushkhin hoped that his crimes would be compared to that of Chikatilo. The investigators were surprised that a cunning and cautious killer began to kill in the midst of a large-scale operation to catch another criminal.

In early 1989, Cheryomushkhin was arrested and soon confessed. On November 3 of the same year, the Rostov Regional Court sentenced him to death. In 1993, he was executed by firing squad.

In the media 
 Documentary film from the series "The investigation was conducted... - Chikatilo's twin"

See also
 List of Russian serial killers

References

External links 

 Maniacs and serial killers: Konstantin Cheryomukhin

1963 births
1993 deaths
Executed Soviet serial killers
Male serial killers
People executed by Russia by firearm
People from Novocherkassk
Russian murderers of children
Russian people convicted of child sexual abuse
Russian rapists
Russian serial killers
Soviet people convicted of child sexual abuse
Soviet rapists
Violence against women in Russia